This is a list of films which have placed number one at the weekly box office in France during 2011. The weeks start on Wednesdays, and finish on Tuesdays.

See also
 Lists of highest-grossing films in France
 List of French films of 2011

References

 

France
2011 in French cinema
2011